Carla M. Skinder is a Democratic former member of the New Hampshire House of Representatives, representing the Sullivan 1st District starting in 2006.

External links
New Hampshire House of Representatives - Carla Skinder official NH House website
Project Vote Smart - Representative Carla M. Skinder (NH) profile
Follow the Money - Carla Skinder
2006 campaign contributions

Members of the New Hampshire House of Representatives
Living people
Women state legislators in New Hampshire
Year of birth missing (living people)
21st-century American women